This is a list of islands in the U.S. state of Delaware.
Artificial Island, New Jersey — A small part of the Island is in New Castle County, Delaware
Pea Patch Island — In the Fort Delaware State Park
Reedy Island
Fenwick Island (Delaware–Maryland) — Barrier island between Delaware and Maryland

Delaware